SAIL Outdoors Inc. is a Canadian outdoor equipment retailer with stores in Quebec and Ontario.

Summary 
SAIL Outdoors Inc. is a Canadian retailing company specializing in outdoor equipment and sport equipment. The company is more than 40 years old and had about 1,100 employees as of June 2021. With head office in Quebec. The Quebec-based retailer operates two chains:

 SAIL with 12 standalone stores focused more on outdoor equipment including outdoor camping, fishing and hunting. Eight locations in Quebec and four in Ontario.

References 

Sporting goods retailers of Canada
Canadian brands
Retail companies established in 1981
1981 establishments in Quebec
Companies that have filed for bankruptcy in Canada